The Šalčia is a river in Lithuania. It originates in a region located to the east of Šalčininkai and runs for 76 km before flowing into the Merkys near Valkininkai.

Rivers of Lithuania
Rivers of Belarus
International rivers of Europe
Belarus–Lithuania border
Rivers of Grodno Region